The R262 road is a regional road in Ireland, located in County Donegal. It connects the N56 at Kilrean to the same road at Drumbeagh, avoiding Ardara and Dunkineely.

References

Regional roads in the Republic of Ireland
Roads in County Donegal